Mallerie Stromswold is a former American politician who was a member of the Montana Legislature from District 50. In 2023, she resigned after citing mental health challenges and backlash for consistently voting against the Republican Party.

She was elected in 2020.

References

External links

Living people
21st-century American politicians
21st-century American women politicians
Women state legislators in Montana
Politicians from Billings, Montana
2001 births

Republican Party members of the Montana House of Representatives